Ahmed Mestiri (2 July 1925 – 23 May 2021) was a Tunisian politician who served as Minister of the Interior.

References

1925 births
2021 deaths
20th-century Tunisian lawyers
Tunisian politicians
Interior ministers of Tunisia
Justice ministers of Tunisia
Neo Destour politicians
Socialist Destourian Party politicians
Movement of Socialist Democrats politicians
University of Paris alumni
People from La Marsa